Hemidoras stenopeltis is a species of thorny catfish found in the Amazon basin of Brazil, Colombia and Peru.  This species grows to a length of  SL.

References 
 

Doradidae
Freshwater fish of Brazil
Freshwater fish of Colombia
Freshwater fish of Peru
Fish of the Amazon basin
Fish described in 1855
Taxa named by Rudolf Kner